Catenalis is a genus of extinct plants of the Early Devonian (Pragian, around ). Fossils were first found in the Posongchong Formation of eastern Yunnan, China. The leafless stems (axes) bore 10-12 elliptical spore-forming organs or sporangia on side branches. To release their spores, the sporangia split at the opposite end to their attachment to the stem. Its phylogenetic relationship to other land plants is considered uncertain at present.

References

Early Devonian plants
Prehistoric plant genera